Suzanne Sens (15 September 1930 – 13 February 2023) was a French writer, author, and teacher.

Biography
Born in Le Genest-Saint-Isle on 15 September 1930, Sens worked as a teacher in numerous villages in Mayenne, including Laval.

Suzanne Sens died on 13 February 2023, at the age of 92.

Works

Fiction
Le Secret de madame Miesko
Un drame sous l'Empire
Je suis Mozart
Le Chouan de Mortefontaine
L'Été dans la Tourmente
Les Compagnons
Les Forgerons de la Malterre
Les Contrebandiers du Sel
Fils de Métèque
Mémoires d'Hubert, écuyer de Janville
Le Chant du Cygne
Légendes et histoires vraies dans le Maine

Historical
Les Parlers du Maine
Voyage à travers l'histoire de la Mayenne
L'histoire de la Mayenne racontée aux enfants

Biographies
La Fontaine (1980)
Chopin (1981)
Découverte d'Érik Satie (1988)
Alain Gerbault (1993)

References

1930 births
2023 deaths
20th-century French writers
20th-century French women writers
French children's writers
French women children's writers
People from Mayenne